Vahi is a small borough in Tartu Parish, Tartu County in eastern Estonia. It has a population of 1620 (as of 31 December 2011).

References

Boroughs and small boroughs in Estonia
Tartu Parish